Fritz Abplanalp
 Marguerite Louis Blasingame
 Kaili Chun
 Arthur Eriksson
 Marisol Escobar
 Thomas Ridgeway Gould
 Malvina Cornell Hoffman
 Kate Kelly
 Roy King
 Isamu Noguchi
 Marianna Pineda
 Alice Louise Judd Simpich

See also
 :Category:Sculptors from Hawaii
 List of artists who made prints of Hawaii and its people
 List of artists who painted Hawaii and its people

Footnotes

 Sculptors
 Sculptors
Hawaii
Hawaii-related lists